The Battle of Toshkivka was an armed conflict around the city of Toshkivka, a mountainous municipality in the Sieverodonetsk district of the Luhansk Oblast, as part of the Russian invasion of Ukraine in 2022.

Background 

On 24 February 2022, Russia invaded Ukraine, in a steep escalation of the Russo-Ukrainian War, which had begun in 2014. The invasion caused Europe's fastest-growing refugee crisis since World War II, with more than 6.5 million Ukrainians fleeing the country and a third of the population displaced. On 8 May, Serhiy Haidai, governor of Luhansk Oblast, said on his Telegram channel that the Russians controlled only half of the city of Popasna, but later admitted Ukrainian forces had pulled out. By 12 May, Russian forces had defeated Ukrainian forces in the Battle of Rubizhne and established full control of the city, furthering their attempts at encircling Sievierodonetsk.

Toshkivka is a village of 5,000 just south of the major city of Lysychansk, and with the nearby town of Ustynivka, was a strategic city for Ukrainian and Russian/pro-Russian forces in the Battle of Donbas. For whoever holds the town, there is access to Lysychansk and the other few towns in Luhansk Oblast west of the Donets river.

Battle 
The battle began on May 9, after Russian and LPR forces launched multiple attacks on the settlements of Toshkivka, Voevodivka, and Nyzhnie, but were repulsed by Ukrainian forces. Nine tanks, one Orlan-10 drone, and various other equipment on the Russian side were destroyed. After a few days of low-level fighting, the battle raged again on May 20 and May 23, although the Russian forces were unable to gain much ground. In an attempt to relieve troops fighting in the much larger battle of Sievierodonetsk, Russian forces launched an assault on Toshkivka, which partially succeeded. On June 21, both the Russian and Ukrainian Ministries of Defense stated that Russian and LPR forces were in control of Toshkivka, with the Ukrainian side stating that their troops had also withdrawn from the pocket enveloping the towns of Hirske and Zolote.

See also 
 Battle of Sievierodonetsk (2022)
 List of military engagements during the 2022 Russian invasion of Ukraine

References 

Toshkivka
May 2022 events in Ukraine
June 2022 events in Ukraine
Eastern Ukraine offensive
Battles involving the Luhansk People's Republic
History of Luhansk Oblast